Cáceres del Perú District is one of nine districts of the Santa Province in the Ancash Region in Peru.

The province was named after the Peruvian president Andrés Avelino Cáceres.

See also 
 Hatun Hirka
 Kushuru
 Puka Punta
 Qarwaqucha
 Quñuqranra
 Yana Yaku

References

Districts of the Santa Province
Districts of the Ancash Region